Friends of Hell is the second studio album by the British doom metal band Witchfinder General. It was released in 1983 on Heavy Metal Records. Drummer Graham Ditchfield was dismissed at the end of the recording sessions and is not listed as a band member.

Track listing
All songs by Zeeb Parkes and Phil Cope, except where indicated
Side one
 "Love on Smack" (Parkes, Cope, Rod Hawkes) - 4:10
 "Last Chance" - 3:50 
 "Music" - 3:05 
 "Friends of Hell" - 6:12

Side two
 "Requiem for Youth" - 4:35
 "Shadowed Images" - 4:15 
 "I Lost You" - 2:55
 "Quietus" - 6:20 
 "Quietus Reprise" (Cope) - 0:38

Personnel

Witchfinder General
Zeeb Parkes – vocals
Phil Cope – guitars
Rod Hawkes - bass 
Graham Ditchfield  – drums

Production
Robin George - producer
Dave Lester - engineer
Tim Young - mastering at C.B.S. Studios
Joanne Latham - cover model

References

1983 albums
Witchfinder General (band) albums